The Hillcrest Cemetery is the oldest protestant cemetery in Lunenburg, Nova Scotia and one of the oldest in Canada.  The cemetery is adjacent to the Lunenburg Academy.  The oldest marker is dated 1761, eight years after Lunenburg was established. Hillcrest Cemetery contains 5 Commonwealth war graves from World War I and one from World War II (along with 4 Norwegian war graves from Camp Norway).

Notable interments 

 Honourable William Rudolf
 Rev. Joshua Wingate Weeks (d. 1852), St. Peter's Church, West LaHave Ferry (Grandson of Rev. Joshua Wingate Weeks of St. Paul's Church (Halifax))
 Capt. J. F. McGregor

See also 
 Little Dutch (Deutsch) Church
 Garrison Cemetery (Annapolis Royal, Nova Scotia)
 Royal Navy Burying Ground (Halifax, Nova Scotia)
 Old Burying Ground (Halifax, Nova Scotia)
 Old Parish Burying Ground (Windsor, Nova Scotia)

References

External links
 
 Nova Scotia Archives
  Miss A. Creighton, "An Unforeclosed Mortgage," Acadiensis, October, 1905

Cemeteries in Nova Scotia